Terryana D'Onofrio (born 28 January 1997) is an Italian karateka. She is a two-time bronze medalist in the women's team kata event at the World Karate Championships. She is also a three-time gold medalist in this event at the European Karate Championships.

Career 

She won the silver medal in the women's kata event at the 2018 World University Karate Championships held in Kobe, Japan. She also won one of the bronze medals in the women's team kata event at the 2018 World Karate Championships held in Madrid, Spain.

In 2019, she competed in the women's individual kata event at the World Beach Games held in Doha, Qatar.

She won one of the bronze medals in the women's individual kata event at the 2022 European Karate Championships held in 
Gaziantep, Turkey. She won the gold medal in the women's team kata event.

Achievements

References

External links 
 

Living people
1997 births
Sportspeople from the Province of Potenza
Italian female karateka
20th-century Italian women
21st-century Italian women